Wendell Wyatt (June 15, 1917 – January 28, 2009) was an American attorney and Republican United States Representative from Oregon's 1st congressional district who served in the United States House of Representatives from 1964 until 1975.

Life before Congress 

Born in Eugene, Oregon, Wyatt's family later moved to Portland where he graduated from Jefferson High School in 1935. He received his Bachelor of Laws degree from the University of Oregon in 1941. In World War II, he served in the United States Marine Corps from 1942 until 1946.

Following the war, Wyatt moved to Astoria, where he joined the law firm of former Oregon governor A. W. Norblad. He was Chairman of the Oregon State Republican Central committee from 1955 until 1957. In 1962, Wyatt married Faye Hill; he had previously married and divorced Anne Buchanan.

U.S. Congress 

In 1964, he won a special election to fill the vacancy caused by the death of A. Walter Norblad, the son of Wyatt's law partner. Wyatt was reelected to the four succeeding Congresses. In Congress, Wyatt served on the Interior Committee and the Appropriations Committee, where he helped pass bills that created Oregon's Scoggins Dam on Scoggins Creek, established a 40-foot shipping channel in the Columbia River from Astoria to Portland, created the Cascade Head Scenic Area, and purchased ranch land to be converted to public recreation areas along the Snake River.

Conviction
Following his retirement from Congress, Wyatt was found guilty and fined $750 on one count of failing to report outlays from a secret cash fund he controlled while heading the Richard Nixon campaign in Oregon.

Afterwards
He became a partner at the law firm of Schwabe, Williamson & Wyatt.

The Edith Green - Wendell Wyatt Federal Building in downtown Portland is named in honor of Wyatt and Congresswoman Edith Green, alongside whom he served during all but three days of his tenure in Congress.

Wyatt died in Portland in 2009 at the age of 91.

References

External links 

1917 births
2009 deaths
University of Oregon School of Law alumni
Politicians from Eugene, Oregon
Politicians from Astoria, Oregon
Republican Party members of the United States House of Representatives from Oregon
20th-century American politicians
Lawyers from Eugene, Oregon